George Kane (July 13, 1891 – August 1969) was a professional football player. He attended Fordham University and later played in the National Football League in 1921 with the New York Brickley Giants.

1891 births
1969 deaths
Players of American football from New York (state)
New York Brickley Giants players
Fordham Rams football players
Sportspeople from Rochester, New York